Lake of Ansabère (French: Lac d'Ansabère) is a lake in Pyrénées-Atlantiques, Pyrénées, France. At an elevation of 1859 m, its surface area is 0.002 km².

This lake is the westernmost of the mountain lakes of the Pyrenees, together with Lake of Chourique and Lake of Lhurs, all located at the same longitude.

Itinerary
From the village of Lescun, go between the bridges of Masousa and Lamareich, and follow the track into the small valley of Ansabère.
From there, the path continues to the left around a rocky chaos, and climbs in grassy slopes to reach the basin housing the miniature lake of Ansabère.

References

External links
  IGN Géoportail — Location of the Ansabère lake on a geographical map.
  randonnees-pyrenees-64.fr — Pictures of the itinerary

Lakes of Pyrénées-Atlantiques